Giovane may refer to:
 Giovane Élber (born 1972), Élber de Souza, Brazilian football striker
 Giovane Gávio (born 1970), Brazilian volleyball coach and player
 Giovane Gomes (born 1995), Brazilian football forward
 Giovane (footballer, born 1982), Giovane Alves da Silva, Hong Kong football striker
 Giovane (footballer, born 1998), Giovane Mario De Jesús, Brazilian football midfielder
 Giovane (footballer, born 2003), Giovane Santana do Nascimento, Brazilian football forward

See also